Corações Feridos (Wounded Hearts) is a Brazilian telenovela that was broadcast on SBT from January 16 to May 23, 2012. It is a remake of the Mexican telenovela La Mentira written and adapted by Íris Abravanel, based on the original by Caridad Bravo Adams and directed by Del Rangel.

Cast

References

External links
 Official website 

2012 telenovelas
Brazilian telenovelas
Sistema Brasileiro de Televisão telenovelas
2012 Brazilian television series debuts
2012 Brazilian television series endings
Brazilian television series based on Mexican television series
Portuguese-language telenovelas